A stone and muller is a hand-operated tool used for mixing and grinding paint. The stone and muller was popular with artists and tradesmen from the late 18th through the 19th century. A stone and muller differs from a mortar and pestle in that the former consists of two flat stone surfaces which are rubbed together to create a paste, whereas the latter consists of a bowl and stick.

See also
Britannica
Malerwerkzeug (in German)

Footnotes

References
Evans, Nancy Goyne (2006): Windsor-chair Making in America, UPNE,  .
Ure, Andrew and Nicholson, William (1831): A Dictionary of Chemistry and Mineralogy: With Their Applications, Cole Collection of Chemistry, Fourth Edition, published by Thomas Tegg, London, and R. Griffin & Co., Glasgow.

Hand tools
Paints